Westboro is a station in Ottawa, Ontario. It is located in the Westboro neighbourhood, on Scott Street between Athlone and Tweedsmuir avenues.

The Transitway in the area was in a below-grade 'trench' parallelling Scott Street. Each platform had an elevator and stairway to the ground level above; the two sides were connected by an enclosed pedestrian bridge, and the ground-level station area also had platforms for local buses. In June 2022, this stretch of Transitway was permanently closed to facilitate O-Train Stage 2 construction. The bus stops were relocated to curbside along Scott Street, and the original station was closed.

It is within walking distance of the Minto Metropole, Ottawa's second-tallest residential building.

History

January 2019 accident

On 11 January 2019, an accident occurred at Westboro station. Double decker bus 8155, an Alexander-Dennis Enviro500 bus purchased by OC Transpo in 2017, was driven into the lower platform at the station while running as route 269 Bridlewood. It ejected several passengers from the top floor of the bus, killing three people (including one on the platform). The Transitway was closed between Tunney's Pasture and Lincoln Fields as a result of the accident.

Service

The following routes serve Westboro station as of October 6, 2019:

References

External links
Westboro station page

Railway stations scheduled to open in 2026
Transitway (Ottawa) stations